The Sea of the Ravens is a novel of historical fiction by Harold Lamb and illustrators George Barr, and Alicia Austin. It was first published in stand-alone book form in 1983 by Donald M. Grant, Publisher, Inc. in an edition of 1,925 copies of which 200 were specially bound and signed by the artists. The novel originally appeared in Adventure in 1927. It was published with its prequel and sequel novels (which had also appeared in Adventure) with new linking sections by Doubleday in 1931.

References
 
 

1983 American novels
American historical novels
Books illustrated by Alicia Austin
Books illustrated by George Barr
Works originally published in Adventure (magazine)
1927 American novels
Donald M. Grant, Publisher books